American singer Omarion has released five studio albums, three collaborative albums, two extended plays (EPs), one mixtape and thirty singles (including eleven as a featured artist).

Albums

Studio albums

Compilation albums

Extended plays

Mixtapes

DVDs

Singles

As lead artist

As featured artist

Promotional singles

Other charted songs

Guest appearances

Music videos

See also
B2K discography

Notes

References

Hip hop discographies
Discographies of American artists